The men's decathlon at the 2022 European Athletics Championships took place at the Olympiastadion on 15 and 16 August.

Records

Schedule

Results

100 metres

Long jump

Shot put

High jump

400 metres

110 metres hurdles

Discus throw

Pole vault

Javelin throw

1500 metres

Final standings

References

Decathlon
Combined events at the European Athletics Championships